Sissala may be,

Sissala East District, Ghana
Sissala West District
Sissala language